Cannon v. United States, 116 U.S. 55 (1885), was a United States Supreme Court case in which the Court held compacts for sexual non-intercourse, easily made and easily broken, when the prior marriage relations continue to exist, with the occupation of the same house and table and the keeping up of the same family unity, is not a lawful substitute for the monogamous family which alone the statute tolerates.

References

External links
 

United States law and polygamy in Mormonism
United States free exercise of religion case law
1885 in United States case law
United States Supreme Court cases
United States Supreme Court cases of the Waite Court